Fedorkovo is a rural locality (a village) in Fominskoye Rural Settlement, Gorokhovetsky District, Vladimir Oblast, Russia. The population was 72 as of 2010.

Geography 
Fedorkovo is located on the Suvoroshch River, 49 km southwest of Gorokhovets (the district's administrative centre) by road. Myasnikovo is the nearest rural locality.

References 

Rural localities in Gorokhovetsky District